Abatocera keyensis is a species of beetle in the family Cerambycidae. It was described by Breuning in 1943. It is known from Indonesia.

References

Batocerini
Beetles described in 1943